Glyphidocera guaroa is a moth in the family Autostichidae. It was described by Adamski in 2002. It is found in Costa Rica, where it ranges from the 
coastal Pacific to the coastal Caribbean, and from the western province of Guanacaste east to the southeastern province of Puntarenas near Panama.

Etymology
The species is named for the Costa Rican liquor guaro, made from sugar cane.

References

Moths described in 2002
Glyphidocerinae